Jim Larsen (born 6 November 1985) is a Danish former professional footballer who played as a centre-back.

Club career

Early years
Larsen was born in Korsør, West Zealand, Denmark, and from an early age joined the AGF academy of Hessel Gods Fodboldkostskole in tenth grade, where he was coached by the likes of Flemming Povlsen and Lars Lundkvist, and played for Grenaa IF's team in the Jutland Series and Denmark Series. He then left AGF and followed Lundkvist to Brabrand, where he played for two years in the second-tier Danish 1st Division, before signing with Silkeborg.

Rosenborg
On 12 March 2011, Larsen signed a four-year contract with Tippeligaen club Rosenborg. In his debut season at the club, he scored six goals as Rosenborg finished in a disappointing third place.

Club Brugge
In July 2012, Larsen moved to Club Brugge. His stay in Belgium was unsuccessful—after only 17 appearances and one goal, Larsen left the club due to recurring injuries.

Midtjylland
On 15 August 2014, it was announced that Larsen had signed a one-year contract with Midtjylland. He made his debut on the same day as replacement for the injured Erik Sviatchenko in a 2–1 victory against FC Copenhagen. In January 2015, he signed a one-year contract extension with the club until July 2016. In his first season at the club, Larsen made 18 appearances for Midtjylland and scored three goals, as the team won their first Superliga title.

After struggling with injuries during large parts of the 2015–16 season, Larsen announced that he was retiring from football at the age of 30.

International career
On 11 October 2009, Larsen was called up for the Danish national team for a 2010 FIFA World Cup qualifier against Hungary, after Per Krøldrup was injured.

Honours
Midtjylland
 Danish Superliga: 2014–15 season

References

External links 
 Jim Larsen in Danish Superliga

1985 births
Living people
People from Korsør
Danish men's footballers
Brabrand IF players
FC Djursland players
Silkeborg IF players
FC Midtjylland players
Rosenborg BK players
Club Brugge KV players
Denmark Series players
Danish 1st Division players
Danish Superliga players
Eliteserien players
Belgian Pro League players
Danish expatriate men's footballers
Expatriate footballers in Belgium
Danish expatriate sportspeople in Belgium
Expatriate footballers in Norway
Association football defenders
Sportspeople from Region Zealand